Hoagy may refer to:

 Hoagy Carmichael (born Hoagland Howard Carmichael; 1899–1981),  American composer, pianist, singer, actor, and bandleader
 Hoagy Lands (1936–2002), American soul singer born Victor I. Hoagland, Sr.

See also
 
 
 Hoagie, another name for a submarine sandwich
 Hoagie roll, a type of long flat roll used to prepare hoagie sandwiches